Mark II Xylokaravis, (? – after 1467) was Ecumenical Patriarch of Constantinople from 1465 to 1466. In 1467 he became Archbishop of Ohrid, a post he held until his death.

Life
Concerning the early life of Mark our main source is a document of the Senate of Venice dated 26 June 1466, which orders the Venetian government in Crete to prevent Mark and his father in case they tried to seek refuge on the island. From this document scholars, such as Laurent, deduce that in June 1466 Mark was actually Patriarch, that he and his family had previously been in Crete and that they opposed the East-West Union of Churches established in the Council of Florence and supported by the Republic of Venice.

Mark became Metropolitan of Adrianople in 1464, and in autumn 1465 (or early 1466) he was elected Patriarch of Constantinople with the support of lay archons such as the Great Chartophylax George Galesiotes and the Grand Ecclesiarch (i.e. Head Sacristan) Manuel (the future Patriarch Maximus III), as well as the secretary of the Sultan Demetrios Kyritzes. On the other hand, it is known that some bishops refused to commemorate him during the Divine Liturgy, as a sign that they did not recognize him as patriarch, probably accusing him of simony.

Mark clashed mainly with the faction composed of the nobles of the former Empire of Trebizond who were forced to move to Istanbul (Constantinople) after Trebizond's fall to the Ottomans in 1461. This faction supported its own candidate for the patriarchal throne, the future Patriarch Symeon of Trebizond. Symeon was successful in obtaining the throne, giving 2000 pieces of gold as a present to the Ottoman government, thus beginning a simoniac practice that marked the history of the Patriarchate of Constantinople for the following centuries. According to Laurent however, who places the patriarchate of Mark after the one of Symeon, it was Mark that bought the patriarchal office paying 2000 pieces of gold.

Whichever the cause, Mark was deposed in humiliation from the throne, facing lapidation in autumn 1466 or early 1467. However he was soon rehabilitated and appointed by Sultan Mehmed II as Archbishop of Ohrid. The Archbishopric of Ohrid was at the time the semi-autonomous main religious center of the Ottoman Bulgaria. The date of death of Mark is not known.

Disputed chronology
There is no consensus among scholars concerning the chronology of Mark II's reign.

Many scholars, such as Kiminas (2009), Runciman (1985), Grumel (1958) and Bishop Germanos of Sardeis (1933–8), as well as the official website of the Ecumenical Patriarchate, follow the chronicles of Dorotheos of Monemvasia and place the reign of Mark II before Symeon I, even if with some slightly different suggestions about the precise dates of the reign, however generally in the range from 1465 to 1467.

Laurent (1968), followed by Podskalsky (1988), believes that the clashes with Symeon happened when Mark was still Metropolitan of Adrianople, and place Symeon's reign before Mark's. For a comparison of the main proposals, see the List of Patriarchs of Constantinople. Laurent alone suggests a second short patriarchate of Mark after the first reign of Dionysius I at end 1471.

Notes


Sources

 
 
  

15th-century patriarchs of Constantinople
Archbishops of Ohrid
Simony